Said Fazal Akbar was the first Governor of Kunar province in Afghanistan after the fall of the Taliban in 2001.  He was an ex-Mujahideen who was running a clothing store in Oakland, California when he was appointed Governor by President Hamid Karzai.  His governorship is chronicled in the book by his son, Hyder Akbar, "Come Back to Afghanistan, A California Teenager's Story"

References

Governors of Kunar Province
Living people
Year of birth missing (living people)